Maxine Leeds Craig is a professor in the Sociology Department at the University of California, Davis (USA).

Craig was a doctoral student of Todd Gitlin at the University of California, Berkeley; her doctoral dissertation became the book, Ain't I a Beauty Queen? Black Women, Beauty, and the Politics of Race (2002). Her second book, Sorry I Don’t Dance: Why Men Refuse to Move (2013), was awarded the 2014 Best Publication Award of the American Sociological Association’s section on Body and Embodiment.

She was chair of the American Sociological Association Section on Race, Gender, and Class for 2009–2010.

Publications
Ain't I A Beauty Queen?: Black Women, Beauty, and the Politics of Race. Oxford University Press, 2002. .
Sorry I Don't Dance: Why Men Refuse To Move. Oxford University Press, 2013. .

References

External links

Living people
African-American academics
Black studies scholars
University of California, Berkeley alumni
Year of birth missing (living people)
American sociologists
American women sociologists
21st-century African-American people
21st-century African-American women